Coltrane Jazz is the sixth studio album by jazz musician John Coltrane. It was released in early 1961 on Atlantic Records. Most of the album features Coltrane playing with his former Miles Davis bandmates, pianist Wynton Kelly, bassist Paul Chambers and drummer Jimmy Cobb during two sessions in November and December, 1959. The exception is the track "Village Blues", which was recorded October 21, 1960. "Village Blues" comes from the first recording session featuring the Coltrane playing with pianist McCoy Tyner and drummer Elvin Jones, who toured and recorded with Coltrane as part of his celebrated "classic quartet" from 1960 to 1965.

Background
In 1959, Miles Davis' business manager Harold Lovett negotiated a contract for Coltrane with Atlantic, the terms including a $7000 annual guarantee. After having recorded most of Giant Steps in May of that year, Coltrane started having bridge problems, and did not return to a recording studio for six months. When he returned to the studio in November and December for the Coltrane Jazz recording sessions, he employed the rhythm section from the Miles Davis Quintet. The sessions yielded the bulk of Coltrane Jazz, and the track "Naima," which was included on the Giant Steps album. "Like Sonny," a tribute to colleague Sonny Rollins, is based on a melodic figure that Sonny Rollins can be heard playing at 3:22 during his solo on "My Old Flame" on Kenny Dorham's 1957 album Jazz Contrasts. (Coltrane made one further studio recording of "Like Sonny" in September of 1960 for Roulette Records, who issued the piece under the title "Simple Like" in 1962 on the album "The Best of Birdland: Volume 1".)

After leaving Davis's band in the spring of 1960, Coltrane formed his first touring quartet for a residency at the Jazz Gallery club in Manhattan. Coltrane initially hired pianist Steve Kuhn and drummer Pete "La Roca" Sims for his group, along with bassist Steve Davis, but by September, the quartet's rhythm section consisted of Tyner, Jones, and Davis. This group entered the studio on October 21, recording "Village Blues" at the beginning of the week of sessions that produced Coltrane's My Favorite Things album.

On June 20, 2000, Rhino Records reissued Coltrane Jazz as part of its Atlantic 50th Anniversary Jazz Gallery series. Included were four bonus tracks, two of which had appeared in 1975 on the Atlantic compilation Alternate Takes, the remaining pair earlier issued on The Heavyweight Champion: The Complete Atlantic Recordings in 1995. Two bonus tracks, the alternate versions of "Like Sonny", had been recorded at the March 26, 1959 sessions that were not used for Giant Steps.

Track listing

Side one

Side two

2000 reissue bonus tracks

Personnel
 John Coltrane – tenor saxophone
 Wynton Kelly – piano
 Paul Chambers – bass
 Jimmy Cobb – drums
 McCoy Tyner – piano on "Village Blues"
 Steve Davis – bass on "Village Blues"
 Elvin Jones – drums on "Village Blues"
 Cedar Walton – piano on "Like Sonny" alternate versions
 Lex Humphries – drums on "Like Sonny" alternate versions

Production personnel
 Nesuhi Ertegün – production
 Tom Dowd, Phil Iehle – engineering
 Lee Friedlander – photography
 Eutemey – cover design
 Zita Carno – liner notes
 Patrick Milligan – reissue supervision
 Dan Hersch – digital remastering
 Rachel Gutek – reissue design
 Hugh Brown – reissue art direction
 Neil Tessler – reissue liner notes
 Vanessa Atkins – reissue editorial supervision
 Shawn Amos – reissue editorial coordination

References

1961 albums
John Coltrane albums
Atlantic Records albums
Albums produced by Nesuhi Ertegun